Quiet is an album by jazz guitarist John Scofield. As with his 1992 album Grace Under Pressure, Scofield chose to integrate a horn section into his compositions. The album also features bass guitarist Steve Swallow (who was in Scofield's trio of 1980-1983), and drummer Bill Stewart. Quiet is unique in Scofield's discography as he plays only acoustic guitar. Veteran saxophonist Wayne Shorter appears on several tracks. Scofield returned to this album's format of a trio with orchestration on This Meets That in 2007.

Critical reception

The Penguin Guide to Jazz Recordings selected the album as part of its suggested “core collection” of essential recordings.

Track listing

Personnel
 John Scofield – acoustic guitar
 Wayne Shorter – tenor saxophone
 Steve Swallow – bass guitar
 Duduka da Fonseca – drums 
 Bill Stewart – drums
 Horn section
 Randy Brecker – trumpet and flugelhorn
 John Clark – French horn
 Fred Griffen – French horn
 Howard Johnson – tuba and baritone saxophone
 Lawrence Feldman – flute, alto flute, tenor saxophone
 Charles Pillow – alto flute, English horn, tenor saxophone
 Roger Rosenberg – bass clarinet

References 

1996 albums
Verve Records albums
John Scofield albums